Silage is a type of fodder made from green foliage crops which have been preserved by fermentation to the point of acidification. It can be fed to cattle, sheep and other such ruminants (cud-chewing animals). The fermentation and storage process is called ensilage, ensiling or silaging. Silage is usually made from grass crops, including maize, sorghum or other cereals, using the entire green plant (not just the grain). Silage can be made from many field crops, and special terms may be used depending on type: oatlage for oats, haylage for alfalfa (haylage may also refer to high dry matter silage made from hay).
 Silage can be made using several methods, largely dependent on available technology, local tradition or prevailing climate.

Production

The crops most often used for ensilage are the ordinary grasses, clovers, alfalfa, vetches, oats, rye and maize. Many crops have ensilaging potential, including potatoes and various weeds, notably spurrey such as Spergula arvensis. Silage must be made from plant material with a suitable moisture content: about 50% to 60% depending on the means of storage, the degree of compression, and the amount of water that will be lost in storage, but not exceeding 75%. Weather during harvest need not be as fair and dry as when harvesting for drying. For corn, harvest begins when the whole-plant moisture is at a suitable level, ideally a few days before it is ripe. For pasture-type crops, the grass is mown and allowed to wilt for a day or so until the moisture content drops to a suitable level. Ideally the crop is mowed when in full flower, and deposited in the silo on the day of its cutting.

The material is spread in uniform layers over the floor of the silo, and closely packed. When the silo is filled or the stack built, a layer of straw or some other dry porous substance may be spread over the surface. In the silo, the pressure of the material, when chaffed, excludes air from all but the top layer; in the case of the stack, extra pressure is applied by weights to prevent excessive heating.

Equipment
Forage harvesters collect and chop the plant material, and deposit it in trucks or wagons. These forage harvesters can be either tractor-drawn or self-propelled. Harvesters blow the chaff into the wagon through a chute at the rear or side of the machine. Chaff may also be emptied into a bagger, which puts the silage into a large plastic bag that is laid out on the ground.

In North America, Australia, northwestern Europe, and New Zealand it is common for silage to be placed in large heaps on the ground, rolled by tractor to push out the air, then covered with plastic sheets that are held down by used tires or tire ring walls. In New Zealand and Northern Europe, 'clamps' made of concrete or old wooden railway ties (sleepers) and built into the side of a bank are sometimes used. The chopped grass can then be dumped in at the top, to be drawn from the bottom in winter. This requires considerable effort to compress the stack in the silo to cure it properly. Again, the pit is covered with plastic sheet and weighed down with tires.

In an alternative method, the cut vegetation is formed into bales using a baler, making balage (North America) or silage bales (UK, Australia, New Zealand). The grass or other forage is cut and partly dried until it contains 30–40% moisture (much drier than bulk silage, but too damp to be stored as dry hay).  It is then made into large bales which are wrapped tightly in plastic to exclude air.  The plastic may wrap the whole of each cylindrical or cuboid bale, or be wrapped around only the curved sides of a cylindrical bale, leaving the ends uncovered.  In this case, the bales are placed tightly end to end on the ground, making a long continuous "sausage" of silage, often at the side of a field.  The wrapping may be performed by a bale wrapper, while the baled silage is handled using a bale handler or a front-loader, either impaling the bale on a flap, or by using a special grab. The flaps do not hole the bales.

The percentage of dry matter can vary from about 20% dry matter upwards. The continuous "sausage" referred to above is made with a special machine which wraps the bales as they are pushed through a rotating hoop which applies the bale wrap to the outside of the bales (round or square) in a continuous wrap. The machine places the bales on the ground after wrapping by moving forward slowly during the wrapping process.

Haylage

Haylage sometimes refers to high dry matter silage of around 40% to 60%, typically made from hay. Horse haylage is usually 60% to 70% dry matter, made in small bales or larger bales.

Handling of wrapped bales is most often with some type of gripper that squeezes the plastic-covered bale between two metal parts to avoid puncturing the plastic. Simple fixed versions are available for round bales which are made of two shaped pipes or tubes spaced apart to slide under the sides of the bale, but when lifted will not let it slip through. Often used on the tractor rear three-point linkage, they incorporate a trip tipping mechanism which can flip the bales over on to the flat side or end for storage on the thickest plastic layers.

Fermentation
 
Silage undergoes anaerobic fermentation, which starts about 48 hours after the silo is filled, and converts sugars to acids. Fermentation is essentially complete after about two weeks.

Before anaerobic fermentation starts, there is an aerobic phase in which the trapped oxygen is consumed. How closely the fodder is packed determines the nature of the resulting silage by regulating the chemical reactions that occur in the stack. When closely packed, the supply of oxygen is limited, and the attendant acid fermentation brings about decomposition of the carbohydrates present into acetic, butyric and lactic acids. This product is named sour silage. The nitrogenous ingredients of the fodder also change: in making sour silage, as much as one-third of the albuminoids may be converted into amino and ammonium compounds; in making sweet silage, a smaller proportion is changed, but they become less digestible. If the fermentation process is poorly managed, sour silage acquires an unpleasant odour due to excess production of ammonia or butyric acid (the latter is responsible for the smell of rancid butter).

In the past, the fermentation was conducted by indigenous microorganisms, but, today, some bulk silage is inoculated with specific microorganisms to speed fermentation or improve the resulting silage. Silage inoculants contain one or more strains of lactic acid bacteria, and the most common is Lactobacillus plantarum. Other bacteria used include Lactobacillus buchneri, Enterococcus faecium and Pediococcus species.

Ryegrasses have high sugars and respond to nitrogen fertiliser better than any other grass species. These two qualities have made ryegrass the most popular grass for silage-making for the last sixty years. There are three ryegrasses in seed form and commonly used: Italian, Perennial and Hybrid.

Pollution and waste
The fermentation process of silo or pit silage releases liquid. Silo effluent is corrosive. It can also contaminate water sources unless collected and treated. The high nutrient content can lead to eutrophication (hypertrophication), the growth of bacterial or algal blooms.

Plastic sheeting used for sealing pit or baled silage needs proper disposal, and some areas have recycling schemes for it. Traditionally, farms have burned silage plastics; however odor and smoke concerns have led certain communities to restrict that practice.

Storing silage
Silage must be firmly packed to minimize the oxygen content, lest it spoil.

Silage goes through four major stages in a silo:
Presealing, which, after the first few days after filling a silo, enables some respiration and some dry matter (DM) loss, but stops.
Fermentation, which occurs over a few weeks. pH drops, and there is more DM loss, but hemicellulose is broken down; aerobic respiration stops.
Infiltration, which enables some oxygen infiltration, allowing for limited microbial respiration. Available carbohydrates (CHOs) are lost as heat and gas.
Emptying, which exposes surface, causing additional loss; rate of loss increases.

Safety
Silos are potentially hazardous: deaths may occur in the process of filling and maintaining them, and several safety precautions are necessary. There is a risk of injury by machinery or from falls. When a silo is filled, fine dust particles in the air can become explosive because of their large aggregate surface area. Also, fermentation presents respiratory hazards. The ensiling process produces "silo gas" during the early stages of the fermentation process. Silage gas contains nitric oxide (NO), which will react with oxygen (O2) in the air to form nitrogen dioxide (NO2), which is toxic. Lack of oxygen inside the silo can cause asphyxiation. Molds that grow when air reaches cured silage can cause organic dust toxic syndrome. Collapsing silage from large bunker silos has caused deaths. Silage itself poses no special danger.

Nutrition
Ensilage can be substituted for root crops.  Bulk silage is commonly fed to dairy cattle, while baled silage tends to be used for beef cattle, sheep and horses. The advantages of silage as animal feed are several: 
During fermentation, the silage bacteria act on the cellulose and carbohydrates in the forage to produce volatile fatty acids (VFAs), such as acetic, propionic, lactic, and butyric acids. By lowering pH, these produce a hostile environment for competing bacteria that might cause spoilage. The VFAs thus act as natural preservatives, in the same way that the lactic acid in yogurt and cheese increases the preservability of what began as milk, or vinegar (dilute acetic acid) preserves pickled vegetables. This preservative action is particularly important during winter in temperate regions, when green forage is unavailable.
When silage is prepared under optimal conditions, the modest acidity also has the effect of improving palatability and provides a dietary contrast for the animal. (However, excessive production of acetic and butyric acids can reduce palatability: the mix of bacteria is ideally chosen so as to maximize lactic acid production.)
Several of the fermenting organisms produce vitamins: for example, lactobacillus species produce folic acid and vitamin B12.
The fermentation process that produces VFA also yields energy that the bacteria use: some of the energy is released as heat.  Silage is thus modestly lower in caloric content than the original forage, in the same way that yogurt has modestly fewer calories than milk. However, this loss of energy is offset by the preservation characteristics and improved digestibility of silage.

History
Using the same technique as the process for making sauerkraut, green fodder was preserved for animals in parts of Germany since the start of the 19th century. This gained the attention of French agriculturist Auguste Goffart of Sologne, near Orléans. He published a book in 1877 which described the experiences of preserving green crops in silos. Goffart's experience attracted considerable attention. The conditions of dairy farming in the United States suited the ensiling of green corn fodder, and was soon adopted by New England farmers. Francis Morris of Maryland prepared the first silage produced in America in 1876. The favourable results obtained in the US led to the introduction of the system in the United Kingdom, where Thomas Kirby first introduced the process for British dairy herds.

The modern silage preserved with acid and by preventing contact with air was invented by Finnish academic and professor of chemistry Artturi Ilmari Virtanen. Virtanen was awarded the 1945 Nobel prize in chemistry "for his research and inventions in agricultural and nutrition chemistry, especially for his fodder preservation method", practically inventing modern silage.

Early silos were made of stone or concrete either above or below ground, but it is recognized that air may be sufficiently excluded in a tightly pressed stack, though in this case a few inches of the fodder round the sides is generally useless owing to mildew. In the US, structures were typically constructed of wooden cylinders to 35 or 40 ft. in depth.

In the early days of mechanized agriculture (late 1800s), stalks were cut and collected manually using a knife and horsedrawn wagon, and fed into a stationary machine called a "silo filler" that chopped the stalks and blew them up a narrow tube to the top of a tower silo.

Anaerobic digestion

Silage may be used for anaerobic digestion.

Fish silage 
Fish silage is a method used for conserving by-products from fishing for later use as feed in fish farming. This way, the parts of the fish that are not used as human food such as fish guts (entrails), fish heads and trimmings are utilized as ingredients in feed pellets. The silage is performed by first grinding the remains and mixing it with formic acid, and then storing it in a tank. The acid helps with preservation as well as further dissolving the residues. Process tanks for fish silage can be aboard ships or on land.

See also
Artturi Ilmari Virtanen
Grain crimping
Mycoestrogen
Trifolium pratense
Xenoestrogen

References

Sources 
Making and Feeding Silage, John Murdoch, B.Sc, Ph.D. Published by Dairy Farmer (Books) Limited, Lloyd's Chambers, Ipswich, UK 1961)
Feeding baleage to horses – the ultimate guide – Horsetalk.co.nz
 "The Owner-Built Homestead" by Barbara and Ken Kern, New York: Scribner, 1977.

Further reading
 Zhou, Yiqin. Compar[ison of] Fresh or Ensiled Fodders (e.g., Grass, Legume, Corn) on the Production of Greenhouse Gases Following Enteric Fermentation in Beef Cattle. Rouyn-Noranda, Qué.: Université du Québec en Abitibi-Témiscamingue, 2011. N.B.: Research report.

Anaerobic digestion
Fodder